Coccus is a genus of scale insects in the family Coccidae. Several species, such as Coccus viridis, a major pest of coffee, are major agricultural pests. The type species is Coccus hesperidum Linnaeus.

Species

 Coccus acaciae (Newstead, 1917)
 Coccus bromeliae Bouché, 1833
 Coccus capparidis (Green, 1904)
 Coccus celatus De Lotto, 1960
 Coccus gymnospori (Green, 1908)
 Coccus hesperidum Linnaeus, 1758, the  brown soft scale
 Coccus longulus (Douglas, 1887)
 Coccus penangensis Morrison, 1921
 Coccus pseudelongatus (Brain, 1920)
 Coccus pseudohesperidum (Cockerell, 1895)
 Coccus pseudomagnoliarum (Kuwana, 1914)
 Coccus formicarii (Green, 1896)
 Coccus viridis (Green, 1889)

Former species
 Coccus aceris Fabricius, 1794 synonym for Eulecanium tiliae (Linnaeus, 1758)
 Coccus alni Modeer, 1778 synonym for Eulecanium tiliae (Linnaeus, 1758)
 Coccus arens Hodgson, 1968 synonym for Coccus capparidis (Green, 1904)
 Coccus arundinariae Sanders, 1906 synonym for Maacoccus arundinariae (Green, 1904)
 Coccus bauhini Targioni Tozzetti, 1867 synonym for Kermes ilicis (Linnaeus, 1758)
 Coccus bicruciatus Sanders, 1906 synonym for Maacoccus bicruciatus (Green, 1904)
 Coccus cacti Cockerell, 1893 synonym for Dactylopius coccus Costa, 1829
 Coccus celticum Takahashi, 1955 synonym for Coccus longulus (Douglas, 1887)
 Coccus celtium Sasscer, 1911 synonym for Coccus longulus (Douglas, 1887)
 Coccus coffeae Kirkaldy, 1902 synonym for Saissetia coffeae (Walker, 1852)
 Coccus cypraeola Dalman, 1826 synonym for Eulecanium tiliae (Linnaeus, 1758)
 Coccus deltae Corseuil & Barbosa, 1971 synonym for Parthenolecanium perlatum (Cockerell, 1898)
 Coccus diversipes Cockerell, 1905 synonym for Kilifia diversipes (Cockerell, 1905)
 Coccus elongatus Sanders, 1909 synonym for Coccus longulus (Douglas, 1887)
 Coccus fagi Baerensprung, 1849 ambiguous synonym for Cryptococcus fagisuga Lindinger, 1936
 Coccus fagi Walker, 1852 ambiguous synonym for Cryptococcus fagisuga Lindinger, 1936
 Coccus ficus Fernald, 1903 synonym for Coccus longulus (Douglas, 1887)
 Coccus frontalis Sanders, 1906 synonym for Coccus longulus (Douglas, 1887)
 Coccus fuscus Gmelin, 1790 synonym for Eulecanium tiliae (Linnaeus, 1758)
 Coccus iceryi Tao et al., 1983 synonym for Pulvinaria iceryi (Signoret, 1869)
 Coccus ilicis Linnaeus, 1758 synonym for Kermes ilicis (Linnaeus, 1758)
 Coccus impar Bodkin, 1917 synonym for Mesolecanium impar (Cockerell, 1898)
 Coccus lacca Kerr, 1782 synonym for Kerria lacca (Kerr, 1782)
 Coccus mali Schrank, 1781 synonym for Eulecanium tiliae (Linnaeus, 1758)
 Coccus marsupialis Sanders, 1906 synonym for Marsipococcus marsupialis (Green, 1904)
 Coccus namunakuli Ali, 1971 synonym for Parlatoria namunakuli (Green, 1922)
 Coccus perlatus Fernald, 1903 synonym for Parthenolecanium perlatum (Cockerell, 1898)
 Coccus polonicus Linnaeus, 1758 synonym for Porphyrophora polonica (Linnaeus, 1758)
 Coccus pyri Schrank, 1801 synonym for Eulecanium tiliae (Linnaeus, 1758)
 Coccus radicum Beckmann, 1790 synonym for Porphyrophora polonica (Linnaeus, 1758)
 Coccus rubi Schrank, 1801 synonym for Eulecanium tiliae (Linnaeus, 1758)
 Coccus salicum Fabricius, 1781 synonym for Eulecanium tiliae (Linnaeus, 1758)
 Coccus tiliae Linnaeus, 1758 synonym for Eulecanium tiliae (Linnaeus, 1758)
 Coccus xylostei Schrank, 1801 synonym for Eulecanium tiliae (Linnaeus, 1758)

References

Coccidae
Sternorrhyncha genera